Venetiaan is a Dutch surname. Notable people with the surname include:

 Jerrel Venetiaan (born 1971), Dutch kickboxer and mixed martial artist
 Ronald Venetiaan (born 1936), Surinamese politician and former President

Dutch-language surnames